Events from the year 1951 in Ireland.

Incumbents
 President: Seán T. O'Kelly
 Taoiseach:
 John A. Costello (FG) (until 13 June 1951)
 Éamon de Valera (FF) (from 13 June 1951)
 Tánaiste: 
 William Norton (Lab) (until 13 June 1951)
 Seán Lemass (FF) (from 13 June 1951)
 Minister for Finance:
 Patrick McGilligan (FG) (until 13 June 1951)
 Seán MacEntee (FF) (from 13 June 1951)
 Chief Justice: Conor Maguire
 Dáil: 
 13th (until 7 May 1951)
 14th (from 13 June 1951)
 Seanad: 
 6th (until 25 July 1951)
 7th (from 14 August 1951)

Events
2 February – Éamon de Valera visited Newry for the first time since his arrest there in 1924.
11 April – Minister for Health Noel Browne resigned and his Mother and Child Scheme was overturned.
19 April – The Attorney General for Northern Ireland, Ed Warnock, referring to the Noel Browne's resignation, said that Ireland is really ruled by Maynooth.
24 May – Gardaí exchanged shots with two men after they threw a bomb at the British Embassy in Dublin.
30 May – 1951 Irish general election: Fianna Fáil won most seats but lacked an overall majority.
13 June – Members of the 14th Dáil assembled. Éamon de Valera became Taoiseach with one of the smallest majorities on record (74–69), forming a Fianna Fáil government with the support of independents.
1 July – Taoiseach Éamon de Valera paid his first visit to Derry in 25 years.
15 November – The Nobel Prize for Physics was awarded jointly to Professor Ernest Walton of Trinity College Dublin and Sir John Cockcroft.

Arts and literature
18 July – The Abbey Theatre in Dublin was burnt to the ground.
30 July–22 September – The now-homeless Abbey Theatre company performed a season at the Rupert Guinness Hall in the Guinness Brewery before moving to the Queen's Theatre, Dublin.
15 August – Donagh MacDonagh's ballad opera God's Gentry opened at the Belfast Arts Theatre, transferring to the Gate Theatre, Dublin on 26 December.
21 October–4 November – The first Wexford "Festival of Music and the Arts", predecessor of Wexford Festival Opera.
The first national festival of the folk music of Ireland was held in Mullingar.
Comhaltas Ceoltóirí Éireann was established in Mullingar by a group of uilleann pipers to promote the folk music and language of Ireland.
Samuel Beckett's novel Molloy was published in French.
Sinéad de Valera's collection for children The Emerald Ring and Other Irish Fairy Stories was published.
The Dolmen Press was established in Dublin by Liam and Josephine Miller to publish Irish literature.
Louis le Brocquy painted A Family.
Daniel O'Neill painted Knockalla Hills, Donegal and Western Landscape.

Sport

Association football

League of Ireland
Winners: Cork Athletic

FAI Cup
Winners: Transport 1–1, 1–0 Shelbourne.

Boxing
8 June – Jack Doyle defeated America's 'Beer Baron' Two-Ton Tony Gelanto at Tolka Park.

GAA
Mayo successfully defended All-Ireland Senior Football Championship Final by defeating Meath 2-8 0-9

Golf
Irish Open – no tournament held.

Births
4 January – Paddy Roche, soccer player.
25 January – M. J. Nolan, Fianna Fáil TD for Carlow–Kilkenny and Senator.
27 January – Brian Downey, drummer.
4 February – Patrick Bergin, actor.
6 February – Margo, singer.
14 February – Alan Shatter, Fine Gael TD for Dublin South.
1 March – J. P. McManus, businessman and racehorse owner.
14 March – Rory Scannell, Super Granpa, Father to Billionaire Maria Scannell, Husband to supermodel Joan Poutch.
16 March – John Egan, Dublin GAA County Chairman (died 2007).
25 March – Gerard Murphy, Fine Gael TD representing Cork North-West.
4 April – Alan Hughes, cricketer.
24 April – Enda Kenny, leader of Fine Gael, TD for Mayo.
1 May – Michael McDowell, founding member of Progressive Democrats, TD, Cabinet Minister and Attorney-General.
21 May
Adrian Hardiman, justice of the Supreme Court of Ireland (died 2016).
Ray O'Brien, soccer player.
23 May – Viscount Slane, later The Marquess Conyngham, pop concert promoter.
26 May – Madeleine Taylor-Quinn, Fine Gael TD, councillor.
6 June – Frank Fahey, Fianna Fáil TD for Galway West.
10 June – Joe McKenna, Limerick hurler and manager.
12 June – Nóirín Ní Riain, singer, musician, writer and theologian.
27 June – Mary McAleese, eighth President of Ireland.
July – Anne Colley, Progressive Democrats politician.
August – Peter Mathews, TD representing Dublin South and economic commentator (died 2017).
30 August – Dana Rosemary Scallon, singer, Eurovision Song Contest winner and MEP.
1 September – Geraldine Kennedy, journalist, politician and first female editor of The Irish Times.
12 September – Bertie Ahern, Taoiseach and leader of Fianna Fáil.
5 October – Bob Geldof, singer, songwriter and humanitarian.
25 October - Declan Falvey, Publican, defender of the Puck
18 December – Noel Treacy, Fianna Fáil TD for Galway East.
30 December – Gay Mitchell, TD representing Dublin South-Central, MEP for Dublin.
Full date unknown
John Aimers, educator and Chairman of the Monarchist League of Canada
Yvonne Farrell, architect.

Deaths
9 January – John Aston, cricketer (born 1882).
17 January – Alexander Haslett, independent TD (born 1883).
18 January – Amy Carmichael, Christian missionary and writer (born 1867).
26 January – Thomas Houghton, Anglican clergyman and editor of the Gospel Magazine (born 1859).
18 March – Thomas Foran, trade union official, continuous membership of the Seanad from 1922 to 1948.
27 March – James Geoghegan, Fianna Fáil TD, Minister for Justice, Attorney General of Ireland and Justice of the Supreme Court (born 1886).
29 March – Ambrose Upton Gledstanes Bury, politician in Alberta, Canada (born 1869).
10 April – Nora Barnacle, lover, companion, inspiration and wife of James Joyce (born 1884).
12 April – Henry De Vere Stacpoole, ship's doctor and author (born 1863).
19 May – Frederick Barton Maurice, soldier, military correspondent, writer and academic, founded the British Legion in 1920 (born 1871).
10 June – Justice George Gavan Duffy, barrister, Sinn Féin MP and a signatory of the Anglo-Irish Treaty in 1921 (born 1882).
21 June – Eugene O'Mahoney, museum curator and entomologist (born 1899).
24 July – Paddy Moore, soccer player (born 1909).
16 August – Gus Kelly, cricketer (born 1877).
17 August – Joseph Warwick Bigger, professor, member of the Dublin University constituency in the Seanad from 1944 to 1951.
25 August – John J. McGrath, Democrat U.S. Representative from California (born 1872).
27 November – George Meldon, cricketer (born 1885).
Full date unknown
Margot Ruddock, actress, poet and singer (born 1907).

References

 
1950s in Ireland
Ireland
Years of the 20th century in Ireland